Kenneth Merrill Kelly (born October 14, 1988) is an American professional baseball pitcher for the Arizona Diamondbacks of Major League Baseball (MLB). He made his MLB debut on April 1, 2019. Kelly formerly played for the SK Wyverns of the KBO League.

Early life and education
Kelly attended Desert Mountain High School in Scottsdale, Arizona. The Baltimore Orioles selected Kelly in the 37th round of the 2007 Major League Baseball (MLB) draft, but he did not sign a contract. He attended Yavapai College. After playing college baseball at Yavapai for two years, the Cleveland Indians took him in the 22nd round of the 2009 MLB draft, but again, he did not sign. He transferred to Arizona State University, where he played for the Arizona State Sun Devils in 2010.

Career

Tampa Bay Rays
The Tampa Bay Rays selected Kelly in the eighth round (251st overall) of the 2010 MLB draft. Kelly advanced about one minor league level each season, beginning his career at Low-A in 2010 and reaching Triple-A for the first time in 2013. He split his first professional season between the Hudson Valley Renegades and the Bowling Green Hot Rods. He was 8-7 with a 3.28 ERA for the 2011 Charlotte Stone Crabs. He had an 8–3 record and a 3.57 ERA for the 2012 Montgomery Biscuits after being used primarily in relief. In 2013, he went 13–8 with 111 strikeouts and a 3.64 ERA in 28 games (26 starts) for the Biscuits and Triple-A Durham Bulls. He allowed only 128 hits in 158 1/3 innings. He was a non-roster invitee to 2014 spring training, but did not make the Opening Day roster. He pitched the 2014 season for Durham, going 9-4 with a 2.76 ERA, but remained in the minor leagues.

SK Wyverns
Kelly signed with the SK Wyverns of the Korea Baseball Organization (KBO) ahead of the 2015 season. Through 4 seasons, with SK Wyverns, Kelly pitched to a 36-25 record and a 3.80 ERA. He became a free agent after the 2018 season.

Arizona Diamondbacks
On December 4, 2018, the MLB Arizona Diamondbacks signed Kelly to a two-year major league contract. On April 1, 2019, Kelly made his major league debut in a start versus the San Diego Padres. He earned a win and recorded a quality start by totaling six innings, while allowing three runs and striking out three. In his first season with Arizona, Kelly led the National league in losses with 14 but led the team in wins (13) and innings. Kelly began the 2020 season in the rotation before being shut down on September 1 after 5 starts due to a shoulder injury. He returned healthy in 2021 but posted a 7–11 record over 27 starts on a Diamondbacks squad that lost 110 games. 

On April 1, 2022, Kelly signed a two-year, $18 million contract extension with the Diamondbacks. He started the 2022 season with 15-inning scoreless streak, 3 short of the franchise record to begin a season.

Personal life
Kelly's wife Bre gave birth to their first child, a daughter, in February 2022.

References

External links

 
 

1988 births
Living people
2023 World Baseball Classic players
American expatriate baseball players in South Korea
Arizona Diamondbacks players
Arizona State Sun Devils baseball players
Baseball players from Houston
Bowling Green Hot Rods players
Charlotte Stone Crabs players
Durham Bulls players
Hudson Valley Renegades players
KBO League pitchers
Major League Baseball pitchers
Montgomery Biscuits players
SSG Landers players
Yavapai Roughriders baseball players